Mike Leigh is an English director and writer known for his work in film, television and stage.

Film

Short films

Acting roles 
West Eleven (1963) - Uncredited 
Two Left Feet (1965) - Uncredited

Television

Plays

Series

Theatre

Plays

Recurring collaborators
The following is a list of actors which collaborated with Mike Leigh on an ongoing basis. The list only includes Leigh’s feature films.

References 

English directors